Probable ATP-dependent RNA helicase DDX52 is an enzyme that in humans is encoded by the DDX52 gene.

References

Further reading